Samuel Ekemé Ndiba (born July 12, 1966 in Kumba) is a Cameroonian former football player who spent ten seasons in Cameroon, one in Major League Soccer, at least two in the USISL, one in the Continental Indoor Soccer League and five in the National Professional Soccer League / Major Indoor Soccer League.  He was a member of the Cameroon national football team at the 1994 World Cup.

Professional career
In 1984, Ekemé signed with Carmmak Bamenda. He moved to Santos Yaoundé in 1986 in the Cameroon First Division and Canon Yaoundé in 1989.  He achieved his greatest league success with Canon, winning the 1991 and 1992 league titles and the 1993 Cameroon Cup.  In 1995, he moved to the United States and signed with the Hawaii Tsunami in the USISL.  Hawaii won the Northwest Division championship and Ekeme was named the Northwest Division Defender of the Year.  On August 31, 1995, he signed a two-year contract with the Monterrey La Raza of the Continental Indoor Soccer League.  The La Raza won the 1995 CISL championship.  In February 1996, Ekemé was drafted by the Kansas City Wiz with the 146th overall pick (15th round) in the inaugural MLS Draft.  He played twenty-three games with Kansas City during the 1996 season.  On February 26, 1997, he signed with the Kansas City Attack in the National Professional Soccer League.  He joined the team just before the playoffs and was a major part in the team's run to the championship title.  Ekeme would play next four seasons for the Attack.  In the summer of 1997, he played for the Nashville Metros in USISL. He coached the mighty Turner Bears soccer team during the 2001 - 2002 season. He finished his career with four games with the Kansas City Comets during the 2003-2004 Major Indoor Soccer League season.

National team
Ekeme was a member of the Cameroon national football team at the 1994 FIFA World Cup, but did not enter a game during the tournament.

References

External links
 MLS biographies

1966 births
Living people
1994 FIFA World Cup players
Cameroonian expatriate footballers
Cameroon international footballers
Cameroonian footballers
Canon Yaoundé players
Continental Indoor Soccer League players
Cameroonian expatriate sportspeople in the United States
Expatriate footballers in Mexico
Expatriate soccer players in the United States
Hawaii Tsunami players
Kansas City Attack players
Kansas City Comets (2001–2005 MISL) players
Sporting Kansas City players
Major League Soccer players
Monterrey La Raza players
National Professional Soccer League (1984–2001) players
Nashville Metros players
Footballers from Yaoundé
Racing Club Bafoussam players
USISL players
Association football defenders